RMRS PG College (Radhe Mohan Radhey Shayama Postgraduate College, Hindi: राधे मोहन,राधे श्याम स्नातकोत्तर महाविद्यालय,बनकटा,राजेसुल्तानपुर) was established in 1997 by the Government of Uttar Pradesh. The college is in the Ambedkar Nagar district of Uttar Pradesh in India. It is an entirely government-owned higher education institute for female scholars. The college is affiliated to the Dr. Ram Manohar Lohia Avadh University, Faizabad.

Status
The college has been recognized by the University Grants Commission (India) with 2 (f) and 12 (b) category. It receives aid or grants from the UGC, New Delhi and directly administered by the Department of Higher Education, Government of Uttar Pradesh (UP). The assessment and accreditation process of RMRS PG  College was completed by NAAC, Bangalore in April 2011 and awarded with Grade B (CGPA 2.17).

Students
The college provides admission to female students after completion of 10+2 (intermediate) course work in different streams: Humanities, Science and Commerce. The strength of the students is about 6,385 (academic year: 2009–2010), which comprised various sections of society.

Faculty
The selection process of the faculty members is solely done by Public Service Commission of Uttar Pradesh. The commission ensures the minimum qualification by adopting the rules of UGC, New Delhi for the selection of the teachers in Government Degree Colleges of UP. After selection, the appointments are made by the Government of Uttar Pradesh after recommendation from the commission. All faculty members (Assistant Professor, Associate Professor and Professor) belong to Group-A service of the state and are gazetted public servants.

Library
RMRS PG College College possesses large number of books and e-journals for undergraduate (UG) and postgraduate (PG) students in the Central Library.  A separate postgraduate library is on the premises of the college for postgraduate students. A librarian has been appointed by the Department of Higher Education, Government of UP to manage the libraries.

Programs and courses
The college offers undergraduate and postgraduate course work in different streams and programs: Bachelor of Arts (BA), Bachelor of Science (BSc), Bachelor of Commerce (BCom), Master of Arts (MA).

Extracurricular activities
The college provides opportunities to rural students to enhance their educational skills by participating in the talks, discussions, seminars, sports, NSS activities and being activist of Red Cross Society, beside lectures.

Associations
Parent-faculty association and alumnae association have been set up in the college for its overall educational development.

See also
Higher Education in India
Education in Uttar Pradesh
University Grants Commission (India)
National Assessment and Accreditation Council

References

Women's universities and colleges in Uttar Pradesh
Colleges of Dr. Ram Manohar Lohia Awadh University
Colleges in Ambedkar Nagar district
Postgraduate colleges in Uttar Pradesh